For the Winter Olympics, there are 14 venues that have been or will be used for luge. Initially separate from bobsleigh, the sports were first combined in 1976. Luge was combined with bobsleigh finally in 1984 and then with skeleton in 2002.

References

Venues
 
Luge